The 1986 Australian Endurance Championship was a CAMS sanctioned motor racing title open to Touring Cars as specified in the National Competition Rules of CAMS. The title, which was the sixth Australian Endurance Championship, was contested concurrently with the 1986 Australian Manufacturers' Championship, which was the sixteenth in a sequence of manufacturers championships awarded by CAMS, and the seventh to be contested under the Australian Manufacturers' Championship name.

The Australian Endurance Championship was won by Jim Richards driving a BMW 635 CSi and the Australian Manufacturers' Championship was awarded to Nissan. Although Nissan team driver George Fury won 4 of the 6 rounds, missing the opening round at Amaroo Park, failing to finish at Bathurst and only being awarded half points for winning at Calder Park, along with the consistency of Richards who scored in every round (including winning at Amaroo) saw the Kiwi win his second straight Endurance title in the BMW. However, his wins, along with high placings by teammates Gary Scott and Terry Sheil gave Nissan an easy 27 point win over BMW in the Manufacturers' title with Jim Richards virtually playing a lone hand for the Bavarian marque.

Round 5, The Sun South Pacific 300 at Calder Park in Melbourne, saw the first ever rolling start in Australian touring car racing (though rolling starts had been seen in Series Production during the 1960s and 1970s). The race also doubled as the opening round of the five race South Pacific Touring Car Championship, with the second round being the Group A support race for the 1986 Australian Grand Prix in Adelaide. The remaining 3 rounds of the South Pacific series were held in New Zealand with Allan Grice, driving a Commodore in Australia and a Skyline in New Zealand, emerging as champion.

Calendar
The championship was contested over a six-round series.

Class structure
Cars competed in three classes defined according to engine capacity:
 Class A : Up to 2000cc
 Class B : 2001 to 3000cc
 Class C : 3001 to 6000cc

Championship points system
Australian Endurance Championship points were awarded to the drivers of the top twenty placed cars in each round, with the actual allocation dependent on the outright position obtained and the class in which the car was competing.

Two drivers per car were compulsory at both the Sandown and Bathurst rounds.
For races in which two drivers per car were not compulsory but two drivers each drove more than one third distance, points for the position gained were shared equally between the two drivers.
For races in which two drivers per car were not compulsory but two drivers did not both drive more than one third distance each, full points were awarded to the driver who drove the greater distance.
For races in which two drivers were compulsory, full points were awarded to both drivers provided that each had driven more than one third distance.
In all cases points were only awarded to a driver who had driven no more than one car during the event.

Only the highest scoring car of each make earned points (for its manufacturer in each race) and then only the points applicable to the position filled.

Results

Australian Endurance Championship

Australian Manufacturers' Championship

See also
1986 Australian Touring Car season

References

Further reading
 Australia's Greatest Motor Race, 1960 - 1989 (1990)
 Racing Car News, December 1986

Australian Endurance Championship
Australian Manufacturers' Championship
Endurance Championship